Paul Nischal is the Founder President and Chief Executive of N.R.I.Club International and International Overseas Indian Club based in the UK. He joined the Conservative Party in 1965 and subsequently became the first Indian Member of British Parliament Candidate for the British Conservative Party for the 1983 and 1987 General Elections, contesting the Birmingham Small Heath Constituency.  His membership was especially valued for his strong influence in the Asian Business Community of Birmingham. Following the 2nd consecutive UK general election defeat by the Conservative party as the party moved more towards the right of the political spectrum, Paul Nischal joined the Labour Party in 2000.

Paul Nischal acted as a political aid to Rajiv Gandhi the 7th Prime Minister of India in the 1991 campaign. He continues a distinguished role for the City of Birmingham UK in Education as well as performing a role as a Foundation Governor for the Grammar School King Edward VI Five Ways. He has also been heavily active over for the last 35 years for many Indian Charities supporting the educational needs of underprivileged children. He was also member of  The Birmingham City Council Education Committee from 1981 to 1983

Paul Nischal is also National Chairman of Asian Peoples Welfare Society (UK) to lookafter the old and disabled people.

Special Note: Paul Nischal has re-joined the Conservative Party.

Birmingham, Small Heath

Birmingham, Small Heath

See also 
 Nischal
 Jalandhar
 Non-resident Indian and Person of Indian Origin
 Rajiv Gandhi
 King Edward VI Five Ways
 Birmingham Small Heath (UK Parliament constituency)

References

External links
UK Parliamentary Results
UK General Election 1983
UK General Election 1987

People from Jalandhar
Conservative Party (UK) parliamentary candidates
British politicians of Indian descent
Living people
Year of birth missing (living people)